The RAMJAC Corporation is a fictional multinational conglomerate, or megacorp, featured in several novels by Kurt Vonnegut.  In Vonnegut's 1979 novel, Jailbird, the company at its height owns 19 percent of the United States, twice as large as the next largest conglomerate in the "Free World".  Copyrights on Vonnegut's later books are also held by RAMJAC, much like Isaac Asimov's later copyrights are held by Nightfall, Inc.

According to Jailbird, RAMJAC was established by Jack Graham, a mining engineer from West Virginia, and then passed on to his widow, known to the world as Mrs. Jack Graham (in "reality" the former Mary Kathleen O'Looney, the ex-lover of the book's narrator, Walter F. Starbuck). Mrs. Graham ordered her surrogates to "acquire, acquire, acquire", instructions which eventually produced the conglomerate's vast holdings. Two years after her death (her will being concealed by Starbuck for that time), it was discovered that she had transferred ownership of RAMJAC to the "people of the United States", as part of a misguided attempt to bring about widespread state ownership – Mrs. Graham had been a Communist since college. The U.S. government immediately began selling off RAMJAC's assets.

"Divisions and holdings" of The RAMJAC Corporation
 All in the Family
 American Harp Company
 Anheuser-Busch
 AT&T
 Barnum and Bailey Circus
 Bergdorf Goodman
 Bloomingdale's
 Chrysler Air Temp
The Plain Dealer
 Colonel Sanders
Diamond Match Company
 Down Home Records
 Dell Publishing
 Gulf+Western
 Henri Bendel
 Hospitality Associates, Ltd., including the Arapahoe Hotel and the Hilton Department
 The Illinois Institute of Instruction
 Manufacturers Hanover Trust Company
 Marlborough Gallery
 McDonald's
 The New York Times
 Peanuts comic strip
 Pinkerton Detective Agency
 Playboy magazine
 Plymouth Cordage Company
 Ringling Brothers Circus
 The Rosewater Foundation
 Sloane's department store
 Sesame Street
 Tiffany's department store
 Transico
 Kilgore Trout and Sons
 Universal Pictures
 Lawrence Welk
 Youngstown Steel
 Who's Who

References

Kurt Vonnegut characters
Fictional companies